Rutger C. Bregman (born 26 April 1988) is a Dutch popular historian and author. He has published four books on history, philosophy, and economics, including Utopia for Realists: How We Can Build the Ideal World, which has been translated into thirty-two languages. His work has been featured in The Washington Post, The Guardian and the BBC. He has been described by The Guardian as the "Dutch wunderkind of new ideas" and by TED Talks as "one of Europe's most prominent young thinkers". His TED Talk, "Poverty Isn't a Lack of Character; It's a Lack of Cash", was chosen by TED curator Chris Anderson as one of the top ten of 2017.

Early life and education
Bregman was born in Renesse. His father is a Protestant minister, while his mother is a special needs teacher. He earned his Bachelor of Arts in history at Utrecht University in 2009. He earned his Master of Arts in history in 2012, partly at Utrecht and partly at the University of California, Los Angeles. His graduate studies were concentrated on cities, states and citizenship. He was a member of Christian student association SSR-NU.

Career
Bregman thought of becoming an academic historian, but began working as a journalist instead. He writes regularly for the online journal De Correspondent, and was twice nominated for the European Press Prize for his work there. His articles have also been published in The Guardian, The Washington Post, Evonomics, and The Conversation.

Books

Utopia for Realists

Utopia for Realists: How We Can Build the Ideal World (Dutch title: Gratis geld voor iedereen) promotes a more productive and equitable life based on three core ideas which include a universal and unconditional basic income paid to everybody, a short workweek of fifteen hours, and open borders worldwide with the free exchange of citizens between all nations. It was originally written as a series of articles for the Dutch online journal De Correspondent.

In an interview with the Montreal newspaper Le Devoir in September 2017, Bregman said that "to move forward, a society needs dreams, not nightmares. Yet people are caught in the logic of fear. Whether it is Trump, Brexit or the last elections in Germany, they vote against the future and instead for solutions to replace it, believing the past was better based on a thoroughly mistaken view of the world: the world was worse before … Humanity is improving, conditions of life, work and health too. And it's time to open the windows of our minds to see it."

Humankind: A Hopeful History 

In September 2019, Bregman published Humankind: A Hopeful History (Dutch title: De meeste mensen deugen), where he argues that humans are fundamentally mostly decent, and that more recognition of this view would likely be beneficial to everyone, partly as it would reduce excessive cynicism. For example, if society was less adamant on the view that humans are naturally lazy, there would be less reason to oppose the widespread introduction of poverty mitigation measures like basic income. The book takes a multi-disciplinary approach, drawing from the findings of history, economics, psychology, biology, anthropology and archaeology. Bregman's arguments include the assertion that in the state of nature debate, Rousseau, rather than Hobbes, was more correct about humanity's essential goodness. An English translation was published in May 2020. The paperback release was a New York Times Best Seller. In addition to praise, Humankind: Hopeful History has also received strong criticism. Various critics, for example, point to the book's lack of scientific content.

Other books
Prior to the release of Utopia for Realists, Bregman had already published several books, including History of Progress, which won the Liberales book prize for best Dutch-language nonfiction book of 2013.

Other activities

In a TED presentation titled "Poverty Isn't a Lack of Character; It's a Lack of Cash" in April 2017, Bregman argued for a universal basic income as the solution to end poverty.

In January 2019, Bregman took part in a panel debate at the World Economic Forum in Davos, where he criticised the event for its focus on philanthropy rather than tax avoidance and the need for fair taxation. His intervention was widely reported and followed on social media.

A month after his Davos appearance, Bregman was interviewed remotely by Fox News anchor and journalist Tucker Carlson, with a recording originally being scheduled to air at a later point. Bregman told Carlson that the United States "could easily crack down on tax paradises" if they wanted to and that Fox News would not cover stories about tax evasion by the wealthy. He said that Carlson himself had been taking "dirty money" for years from the CATO Institute where he was senior fellow and which is "funded by Koch billionaires", Charles Koch and David Koch. He said that Carlson and other Fox News anchors are "millionaires paid by billionaires", referring to the Murdochs and, in Carlson's case, the Koch brothers. Bregman told Carlson that "what the Murdochs want you to do [on Fox News] is scapegoat immigrants instead of talking about tax avoidance". Carlson was angered by Bregman's comments, calling him a "moron" and telling him to "go fuck [himself]". Carlson later apologized for using profane language, but declared his comments towards Bregman were "genuinely heartfelt". A recording of the interview from Bregman's point of view was obtained by NowThis News, who released the video on 20 February 2019. It later exceeded four million views on YouTube.

Major themes
The major themes of Bregman's works include basic income, the workweek and open borders.

Basic income
Bregman approvingly cites a 1968 US proposal for a guaranteed minimum income, put forward by President Richard Nixon, among others. He also cites a 1974–1979 Canadian federal government project in Dauphin, Manitoba, that temporarily eradicated poverty. "The most popular study on the effects of basic income took place in Manitoba between 1974 and 1979 where everyone received a 'Mincome' (minimum income) of $9,000 a year (by today's standards) from the government, no strings attached. Evelyn Forget, an economist and professor at the University of Manitoba, who looked over the data from the study says there was a 9 percent reduction in working hours among two main groups of citizens. But the reasons why give insight into how basic income can dramatically change the course of someone's life."

Personal life 
Bregman is married to Maartje ter Horst, a photographer. They reside in Houten.

In April 2021 Bregman became a member of Giving What We Can, a community of people who have pledged to give at least 10% of their income to effective charities.

Works 

 Met de kennis van toen : actuele problemen in het licht van de geschiedenis (With the knowledge of back then : current problems in a historical light). Amsterdam: De Bezige Bij, 2012, .
 De geschiedenis van de vooruitgang (The history of progress). Amsterdam, De Bezige Bij, 2013, .
 Gratis geld voor iedereen : en nog vijf grote ideeën die de wereld kunnen veranderen. Amsterdam: De Correspondent, 2014, . English translation: Utopia for realists, and how we can get there (2014).
 Waarom vuilnismannen meer verdienen dan bankiers (Why dustmen deserve more than bankers), with Jesse Frederik. Rotterdam: Maand van de Filosofie, 2015, .
 De meeste mensen deugen, een nieuwe geschiedenis van de mens. Amsterdam: De Correspondent, 2019, . English translation: Humankind : a new history of human nature (2020).
 Het water komt : een brief aan alle Nederlanders (The water is coming : a letter to all Netherlanders). Amsterdam: De Correspondent, 2020, .

See also
 Disclosing New Worlds
 Social justice
 Distribution of wealth
 Income distribution
 Georgism
 Utopian socialism
 Ethical socialism

References

Further reading 

 

1988 births
Living people
Universal basic income writers
21st-century Dutch historians
Dutch non-fiction writers
People from Schouwen-Duiveland
Utrecht University alumni
World historians